Galleria Shopping Centre (formerly known as Westfield Galleria, Centro Galleria and Galleria) is a shopping centre located in Morley, about  northeast of the Perth central business district. It is the 5th largest shopping centre in Western Australia, with several major retailers and approximately 300 specialty retailers.

The shopping centre consists of major retailers including Woolworths, Coles. Kmart, Aldi, Target, Rebel Sports, Myer, Event Cinemas and facilities including toilets, restrooms, info desk, lost and found, wheelchair hire, payphones, recycling stations, Uber and Taxi bays.

The present centre was constructed in stages between 1988 with Coles and Kmart Australia, and in 1994 with Event Cinemas and Myer. In 2008 a new area on level 2 was constructed for Rebel Sports.

History  
The shopping centre was developed as a joint construction between Colonial Mutual Group and Coles Myer. Construction started in 1989 after a fire had destroyed the Boans complex in June 1986. Construction joined three separate shopping centresMorley Shopping Centre (Coles and Kmart), Morley City Shopping Centre (Woolworths and Target) and Boans Shopping Centrewhich were demolished to make way for Galleria. The 1994 redevelopment was designed by the Los Angeles architects RTKL Associates Inc and local firm Oldham Boas Ednie-Brown Architects, Planners & Interior Designers (now known as The Buchan Group). The centre was officially opened on 26 September 1994.

In 1996, Galleria was sold in its entirety by joint owners Coles Myer and Colonial Mutual Group to Westfield Group for $289 million; the centre was renamed as Westfield Galleria.

In 2003, Galleria was acquired from Westfield by Centro Properties Group for $414 million and renamed to Centro Galleria. Westfield Group continued to operate the centre until late 2004 when Centro Properties Group officially took over management of the centre. Along with this, the entrance to Greater Union on the upper-deck parking lot was removed, and replaced with a small outdoor dining piazza. In 2012, private property investment group, Perron Group, acquired 50% of Galleria, entering a co-ownership arrangement with Centro.

In mid-2012, Centro Galleria rebranded as Galleria 220 (to represent its 220 stores), and later simply Galleria, while still under Centro's management. In 2013, Centro rebranded as Federation Centres, and in November, Galleria shopping centre was rebranded as simply Galleria, to match the other centres in the chain. In 2015, Federation Centres rebranded as Vicinity Centres after merging with Novion Property Group.

On 3 February 2015, a transformer exploded around 9.30am near the Woolworths loading bay area resulting in the deaths of 2 people, others suffered serious burn injuries.

In March 2017, major German tenant Aldi opened outside of the complex, replacing the old Morley Library.

References

External links 

Morley, Western Australia
Shopping centres in Perth, Western Australia
Shopping malls established in 1973